Charles R. Kesler (born 1956) is professor of Government at Claremont McKenna College and Claremont Graduate University. He is editor of the Claremont Review of Books, and the author of several books. He also serves on the Board of Trustees at New College of Florida.

Early life
Kesler graduated from Harvard University, where he earned a bachelor of arts degree in Social studies (1978), followed by a Ph.D in Government (1985).

Career
Kesler is a professor of government at Claremont McKenna College and the graduate faculty at Claremont Graduate University.  He is a senior fellow of the far-right Claremont Institute, and teaches at their Publius Fellows Program, a summer institute for promising young conservatives. Additionally, he is the editor of the Claremont Review of Books, a quarterly conservative magazine. He was the director of Henry Salvatori Center at Claremont McKenna College from 1989 to 2008. In 2023, he was appointed by Ron DeSantis to the New College of Florida Board of Trustees.

Kesler was a member of the Trump administration's 18-member 1776 Commission, which released a report on January 18, 2021 (Martin Luther King, Jr. Day) that called for "patriotic education."

Published Works
Saving the Revolution:The Federalist Papers and the American Founding (Free Press, 1987)(Editor only)
Keeping the Tablets: Readings in American Conservatism (HarperCollins, 1988) (Served as Editor along with William F. Buckley, Jr.).
The Federalist Papers (Signet Classics, 2003) (wrote the Introduction)
I Am the Change: Barack Obama and the Crisis of Liberalism (Broadside, 2012)
Crisis of the Two Constitutions: The Rise, Decline, and Recovery of American Greatness (Encounter Books, 2021)

References

External links

1956 births
Living people
Harvard University alumni
Claremont McKenna College faculty
American book editors
American political writers
American male non-fiction writers